Joel Rubin (born 1971) is an American politician and media commentator on domestic political and Middle East affairs. Rubin is the Vice Mayor of the Town of Chevy Chase, Maryland and served as a senior Obama Administration State Department official. He also was in charge of Jewish outreach for Bernie Sanders' 2020 presidential campaign.

Early life and education 
Rubin was born in 1971. He attended Brandeis University for his undergraduate education, where he received a bachelor's degree in politics. He went on to study Carnegie Mellon University's Heinz College, where he received an M.S. in public policy and management with a minor in business administration.

Career

Advocacy 
Rubin served in the Peace Corps in Costa Rica. Rubin was the founding Political Director of J Street, a liberal pro-Israel advocacy organization dedicated to promoting Israeli-Palestinian peace; Rubin worked on Capitol Hill as a legislative assistant to Senators Tom Harkin (D-IA) and Frank Lautenberg (D-NJ).

Executive Branch 
He has worked for three U.S. government agencies in both Republican and Democratic Administrations – the Department of Energy, USAID, and State Department. In January 2015, when he served in the State Department as the Deputy Assistant Secretary of State for Legislative Affairs in the Obama administration, he was an official government witness and testified to the House Select Committee on Benghazi.

Post-Obama Administration career 
Rubin ran for Congress in 2016 in Maryland's 8th congressional district, in what was the most expensive Congressional primary in American history at the time. In 2018 he ran in the Democratic primary for the Maryland House of Delegates. Rubin was a founding board member of the Jewish Democratic Council of America, established in 2017 in the wake of the Unite the Right rally in Charlottesville, Virginia. In 2020, he joined Bernie Sanders' 2020 presidential campaign as head of Jewish outreach.

Media 
Rubin appears as a political commentator on American networks such as MSNBC and Fox News; and on international networks such as i24, China Global Television Network, and Al-Jazeera. He also writes political and national security commentary for Axios, The Forward, Washington Jewish Week, and The Hill.

Rubin was a surrogate for the 2012 Barack Obama presidential campaign; an advocate for the Iran nuclear deal as the Policy Director for Ploughshares Fund; and as a commentator on the 2012 Benghazi attack. Following the 2018 Pittsburgh synagogue shooting at his hometown synagogue, Tree of Life – Or L'Simcha Congregation, Joel appeared on Fox News and MSNBC to discuss the attack, later commenting as well on the rise of antisemitism in America after the 2019 Poway synagogue shooting. Rubin frequently comments on foreign policy & congressional politics for networks such as Fox News, MSNBC, BBC, Al Jazeera.

Joel has also appeared in Jewish magazines for his political work.

Honors and awards 
In 2008 Rubin was awarded the ‘Congressional Staffer of the Year’ award from the Military Officers Association of America. Rubin was also awarded the State Department's Superior Honor Award in 2005.

Personal life 
He lives in Chevy Chase, Maryland.

References 

1971 births
United States Assistant Secretaries of State
Heinz College of Information Systems and Public Policy alumni
Brandeis University alumni
Living people